The 2003 Stanford Cardinal football team represented Stanford University in the 2003 NCAA Division I-A football season. The team was led by head coach Buddy Teevens.

Schedule

Coaching staff

Buddy Teevens – Head coach
David Kelly – Offensive coordinator and associate head coach and wide receivers
Bill Cubit – Quarterbacks
Wayne Moses – Running backs
Tom Quinn – Tight ends and special teams and recruiting coordinator
Steve Morton – Offensive line
A.J. Christoff – Co-defensive coordinator and defensive backs
Dave Tipton – Defensive tackles
Peter McCarty – Defensive ends
Tom Williams – Co-defensive coordinator and linebackers

References

Stanford
Stanford Cardinal football seasons
Stanford Cardinal football